Jhalawar (झालावाड़) Lok Sabha constituency was a Lok Sabha (parliamentary) constituency in Rajasthan state in western India till 2008. In 2008 re-organization, it morphed into Jhalawar-Baran (Lok Sabha constituency).

Assembly segments
Jhalawar Lok Sabha constituency comprised the following eight Vidhan Sabha (legislative assembly) segments: 
 Kishanganj
 Atru
 Chhabra
 Khanpur
 Manohar Thana
 Jhalrapatan
 Pirawa
 Dag

Members of Parliament

2008 onwards:Constituency does not exist

See Jhalawar-Baran (Lok Sabha constituency)

Election results

1999 Lok Sabha

2004 Lok Sabha

See also
 Jhalawar-Baran (Lok Sabha constituency)
 Jhalawar district
 List of former constituencies of the Lok Sabha

Notes

Jhalawar district
Former Lok Sabha constituencies of Rajasthan
Former constituencies of the Lok Sabha
2008 disestablishments in India
Constituencies disestablished in 2008